Telmessos or Telmessus, also Telmissos ( or Τελμισσός), was a town in ancient Caria.

Its site is tentatively located at the remains near Görece in Asiatic Turkey. There was a shrine dedicated to Daphne in Telmessos.

Notes

Populated places in ancient Caria
Former populated places in Turkey
Ancient Greek archaeological sites in Turkey